The anterior atlantooccipital membrane (anterior atlantooccipital ligament) is broad and composed of densely woven fibers, which pass between the anterior margin of the foramen magnum above, and the upper border of the anterior arch of the atlas below.

Laterally, it is continuous with the articular capsules.

In front, it is strengthened in the middle line by a strong, rounded cord, which connects the basilar part of the occipital bone to the tubercle on the anterior arch of the atlas.

This membrane is in relation in front with the rectus capitis anterior muscles, behind with the alar ligaments.

See also 

 Posterior atlantooccipital membrane

References

External links
 

Human head and neck